Ripperdan is an unincorporated community in Madera, California, United States.

References

Unincorporated communities in California
Unincorporated communities in Madera County, California